In mathematics, some functions or groups of functions are important enough to deserve their own names. This is a listing of articles which explain some of these functions in more detail. There is a large theory of special functions which developed out of statistics and mathematical physics. A modern, abstract point of view contrasts large function spaces, which are infinite-dimensional and within which most functions are 'anonymous', with special functions picked out by properties such as symmetry, or relationship to harmonic analysis and group representations.

See also List of types of functions

Elementary functions
Elementary functions are functions built from basic operations (e.g. addition, exponentials, logarithms...)

Algebraic functions
Algebraic functions are functions that can be expressed as the solution of a polynomial equation with integer coefficients.
 Polynomials: Can be generated solely by addition, multiplication, and raising to the power of a positive integer.
 Constant function: polynomial of degree zero, graph is a horizontal straight line
 Linear function: First degree polynomial, graph is a straight line.
 Quadratic function: Second degree polynomial, graph is a parabola.
 Cubic function: Third degree polynomial.
 Quartic function: Fourth degree polynomial.
 Quintic function: Fifth degree polynomial.
 Sextic function: Sixth degree polynomial.
 Rational functions: A ratio of two polynomials.
 nth root
 Square root: Yields a number whose square is the given one.
 Cube root: Yields a number whose cube is the given one.

Elementary transcendental functions
Transcendental functions are functions that are not algebraic.
 Exponential function: raises a fixed number to a variable power.
 Hyperbolic functions: formally similar to the trigonometric functions.
 Logarithms: the inverses of exponential functions; useful to solve equations involving exponentials.
 Natural logarithm
 Common logarithm
 Binary logarithm
 Power functions: raise a variable number to a fixed power; also known as Allometric functions; note: if the power is a rational number it is not strictly a transcendental function.
 Periodic functions
 Trigonometric functions: sine, cosine, tangent, cotangent, secant, cosecant, exsecant, excosecant, versine, coversine, vercosine, covercosine, haversine, hacoversine, havercosine, hacovercosine, etc.; used in geometry and to describe periodic phenomena. See also Gudermannian function.

Special functions

Piecewise special functions

Arithmetic functions
 Sigma function: Sums of powers of divisors of a given natural number.
 Euler's totient function: Number of numbers coprime to (and not bigger than) a given one.
 Prime-counting function:  Number of primes less than or equal to a given number.
 Partition function:  Order-independent count of ways to write a given positive integer as a sum of positive integers.
 Möbius μ function: Sum of the nth primitive roots of unity, it depends on the prime factorization of n.
 Prime omega functions
 Chebyshev functions
 Liouville function, λ(n) = (–1)Ω(n)
 Von Mangoldt function, Λ(n) = log p if n is a positive power of the prime p
 Carmichael function

Antiderivatives of elementary functions
 Logarithmic integral function: Integral of the reciprocal of the logarithm, important in the prime number theorem.
 Exponential integral
 Trigonometric integral: Including Sine Integral and Cosine Integral
 Error function: An integral important for normal random variables.
 Fresnel integral: related to the error function; used in optics.
 Dawson function: occurs in probability.
 Faddeeva function

Gamma and related functions
 Gamma function: A generalization of the factorial function.
 Barnes G-function
 Beta function: Corresponding binomial coefficient analogue.
 Digamma function, Polygamma function
 Incomplete beta function
 Incomplete gamma function
 K-function
 Multivariate gamma function: A generalization of the Gamma function useful in multivariate statistics.
 Student's t-distribution
 Pi function Π(z)= zΓ(z)= (z)!

Elliptic and related functions

Bessel and related functions

Riemann zeta and related functions

Hypergeometric and related functions
 Hypergeometric functions: Versatile family of power series.
 Confluent hypergeometric function
 Associated Legendre functions
 Meijer G-function
 Fox H-function

Iterated exponential and related functions

 Hyper operators
 Iterated logarithm
 Pentation
 Super-logarithms
 Super-roots
 Tetration

Other standard special functions

 Lambert W function: Inverse of f(w) = w exp(w).
 Lamé function
 Mathieu function
 Mittag-Leffler function
 Painlevé transcendents
 Parabolic cylinder function
 Arithmetic–geometric mean

Miscellaneous functions

 Ackermann function: in the theory of computation, a computable function that is not primitive recursive.
 Dirac delta function: everywhere zero except for x = 0; total integral is 1. Not a function but a distribution, but sometimes informally referred to as a function, particularly by physicists and engineers.
 Dirichlet function: is an indicator function that matches 1 to rational numbers and 0 to irrationals. It is nowhere continuous.
 Thomae's function: is a function that is continuous at all irrational numbers and discontinuous at all rational numbers. It is also a modification of Dirichlet function and sometimes called Riemann function.
 Kronecker delta function: is a function of two variables, usually integers, which is 1 if they are equal, and 0 otherwise.
 Minkowski's question mark function: Derivatives vanish on the rationals.
 Weierstrass function: is an example of continuous function that is nowhere differentiable

See also 
 List of types of functions
 Test functions for optimization
 List of mathematical abbreviations

External links 
 Special functions : A programmable special functions calculator.
 Special functions at EqWorld: The World of Mathematical Equations.

Functions
Functions
Functions
 

pl:Funkcje elementarne